"The Book of Love" is a song written by Stephin Merritt and attributed to The Magnetic Fields, an American indie pop group founded and led by him. "The Book of Love" appears on Magnetic Fields' three-volume concept album 69 Love Songs, which contains 69 tracks described as "love songs", 23 tracks in each of the three volumes. The three-volume album was released in 1999, with "the Book of Love" appearing in volume 1 as track number 12.

Versions
It was covered by the American indie band The Airborne Toxic Event in the live album All I Ever Wanted: Live from Walt Disney Concert Hall featuring Calder Quartet. The live recording was released on Island Def Jam Records.

The Croatian musicians 2Cellos recorded an instrumental version on their album In2ition.

Peter Gabriel version

When the Magnetic Fields appeared at London's Lyric Hammersmith Theatre in January 2001 to play their album 69 Love Songs in its entirety, they were joined by Peter Gabriel for an encore of "The Book of Love". He later recorded his own cover of the song for the soundtrack of the 2004 romantic comedy film Shall We Dance? His cover has since been featured in film and television, such as in the Scrubs episode "My Finale" and the South Park episode "Tweek x Craig".

Gabriel's version appeared on his 2010 album Scratch My Back. Gabriel originally intended to release Scratch My Back and And I'll Scratch Yours simultaneously. However, as completion of the latter dragged out, it was instead decided to release a series of double A-sided singles with one song from each album every new full moon during 2010 on iTunes. The first of such singles was actually Gabriel's cover of "The Book of Love", together with Magnetic Fields frontman Stephin Merritt's cover of Gabriel's song "Not One of Us". It was released on 30 January 2010, on the day of January 2010's full moon.

On April 17, 2010, "The Book of Love" / "Not One of Us" as well as the follow-ups "Flume" / "Come Talk to Me" were released on 7" vinyl to independent record stores.

Track listing
Side A: "The Book of Love" (Peter Gabriel) – 3:53
Side B: "Not One of Us" (Peter Gabriel featuring Stephin Merritt) – 3:58

Gavin James version

In 2015, Irish singer-songwriter Gavin James recorded his version appearing on his EP single The Book of Love. The Book of Love EP contains four versions, the official radio track, and three remixes by Raffertie, by JOY (Rework) and Young Wonder.

The track appeared also in a four-track EP by James called For Love and eventually was included on his album Bitter Pill.

The single charted in Belgium reaching number 10 on the Ultratop official chart. It also charted in the Netherlands both on Dutch Top 40 and Dutch Single Top 100.

Track listing
"The Book of Love" – 3:15
"The Book of Love" (Raffertie remix) – 3:40
"The Book of Love" (JOY. rework) – 3:43
"The Book of Love" (Young Wonder remix) – 3:43
"The Book of Love" (Does It Offend You, Yeah? Remix) – 3:49

Charts

Year-end charts

Certifications

"Il Libro Dell' Amore (The Book of Love)" by 2CELLOS feat. Zucchero
The song was translated into Italian as "Il Libro Dell' Amore" and rerecorded by Italian singer Zucchero and the Croatian duo musicians 2Cellos on the album In2ition.

Cheryl Bentyne version
Cheryl Bentyne covered "The Book of Love" on her 2006 album The Book of Love, accompanied by gospel singer Mark Kibble.

Chaps Choir version
On April 30, 2016, the Islington, London-based all-male Chaps Choir released its live version of "The Book of Love" as Side B of a double A-sided 7" vinyl single with Side A being "Anyone Who Knows What Love Is (Will Understand)" by Samantha Whates featuring Chaps Choir. Directed by musician Dominic Stichbury, the Chaps Choir version was recorded at the Union Chapel in Islington and released independently on 2016 Good Chap Records and available as a 7" vinyl and digitally.

Atle Pettersen version
On November 12, 2019, Norwegian pop artist Atle Pettersen released "Juletid" ("Christmas Time") on digital platforms with new Christmas-themed lyrics in Norwegian.

Mike Doughty version 
Mike Doughty released Golden Delicious on February 19, 2008, which included "Book of Love" as an "[iTunes Only (Magnetic Fields Cover)]", track 12, with only acoustic guitar, piano and vocals, very true to the original.

Mishima version
The Catalan band Mishima included a version in Catalan, "El llibre de l'amor", in its 2022 album L'aigua clara (Crystal Clear Water).

In popular culture
The Peter Gabriel cover version was featured in Scrubs during the series finale, "My Finale". 
The Peter Gabriel cover version was also used in the 2004 movie, Shall We Dance?.
Gabriel's version was used in the American TV series South Park in the episode "Tweek x Craig".
In 2014, contestant Sequoia LaDeil sang it during the knockout phase in season 4 of The Voice of Germany broadcast on ProSieben and Sat.1
It appears in the 2014 movie  Extraterrestrial. 
In July 2015, Zoë sang it on the finale of the German The Voice Kids, a singing contest for children of 8 to 14 years old.
In September 2015, Dutch contestant Jasper van Aarst sang it during the Blind Auditions of season 6 of The Voice of Holland becoming part of Team Anouk.
James Patrick Stuart performed the song during the Nurse's Ball on the American soap opera General Hospital
The Magnetic Fields version was used in episode 7 of season 2 of the Netflix show Friends From College in 2019.
The comedian Arthur Smith performs a version of it during Syd, his 2019 show about his late father.
It appeared in its original form in "Get The Picture" (sn. 3, ep. 5)  of Fox's Lethal Weapon.
It is also the source of the title of the film in which the song is prominent, Book of Love starring Simon Baker, Frances O'Connor, and Gregory Smith.
Title of Nicola Yoon's young adult romance Instructions for Dancing taken from the song.

References

The Magnetic Fields songs
1999 songs
Songs written by Stephin Merritt
Baroque pop songs
Pop ballads